Crazy Drake is a platform game released for MS-DOS in 1996. The protagonist of the game is a duck named Prince Drake, whose mission is to rescue a golden egg from Dr. Foulbrain, an evil scientist.

Plot 

Gameplay follows the character Prince Drake, the son of King Drake and Queen Drake of Loonville (Ducktropolis in the eGames version).  After the antagonist, Dr. Foulbrain steals a relic named the Sacred Golden Egg, Prince Drake (disguised as his alter ego Crazy Drake) confronts Dr. Foulbrain to recover the egg.

Gameplay 

There are six worlds in Crazy Drake (plus one bonus hidden level if all are completed). Each world (excluding the hidden level) has 3 levels each, featuring its own set of enemies and its own theme.

 Each level one ends with a boss related to level's theme, for example aliens for Sci-Fi Space.
 Each level two is set in midair and ends with Crazy Drake entering an elevator.
 Each level three ends with the appearance of Dr. Foulbrain.

Legacy 

A new version of the game, made by eGames, was released in 2000. It was included in the CD-ROM game package Arcade Classics, with other eGames titles such as Speedy Eggbert, and Demonstar.

References 

1996 video games
DOS games
DOS-only games
EGames (video game developer) games
Platform games
Single-player video games
Superhero video games
Video games about birds
Video games developed in Ireland